The Argus Range is a mountain range located in Inyo County, California, southeast of the town of Darwin. The range forms the western boundary of Panamint Valley, and the northwestern boundary of Searles Valley.  The Coso Range is located to the west, and the Panamint Range to the east.

Geography
The Argus Range is one of the westernmost of the Basin and Range Province ranges.  The northern end of the range is just south of the Panamint Springs Resort on Highway 190. The range runs south to Argus Peak, just northwest of Searles Lake, near the town of Trona, California. In addition to Argus Peak, the range contains Maturango Peak.

The crest of the Argus Range is located within NAWS China Lake and so the peaks of this range are off-limits to the general public. The two peaks that are most alluring to would-be hikers are Argus Peak and Maturango Peak  towering to the west of Panamint Valley.

Argus Range Wilderness
The Argus Range Wilderness, under the administration of the Bureau of Land Management (BLM), runs  along the east side of the Argus Range. It extends from the military reservation on the west to the foot of the Argus Range on the east. For most of its length, this wilderness area is no more than two miles (3 km) wide. Several private property holdings are located within this wilderness area including a rather deep cherry-stem at Snow Canyon and a  parcel known as Onyx Springs between Shepherd and Bendire Canyons. Many land-owners were affected by the creation of the Argus Range Wilderness Area in 1994  .

References

External links
 Argus Range Wilderness website. Bureau of Land Management.

Mountain ranges of the Mojave Desert
Protected areas of the Mojave Desert